Yu Rui may refer to:
Yu Rui (footballer) (born 1992), Chinese footballer
Yu Rui (swimmer) (born 1982), Chinese swimmer